Georgetown is an unincorporated community in Jefferson Township, Cass County, Indiana.

History
Georgetown was laid out in 1835. It was probably named for the man who owned the town site, George Cicott.

Geography

References

External links

Unincorporated communities in Cass County, Indiana
Unincorporated communities in Indiana
1835 establishments in Indiana
Populated places established in 1835